Axymene is a genus of sea snails, marine gastropod mollusks in the family Muricidae, the murex snails or rock snails.

Species
Species within the genus Axymene include:
 Axymene aucklandicus (E. A. Smith, 1902)
 Axymene traversi (Hutton, 1873)
Species brought into synonymy
 Axymene philippinensis Petuch, 1979: synonym of Preangeria dentata (Schepman, 1911)
 Axymene teres Finlay, 1930: synonym of Xymene teres (Finlay, 1930)
 Axymene turbator Finlay, 1926: synonym of Axymene aucklandicus (E. A. Smith, 1902)

References

External links

Pagodulinae